State Highway 12 (SH 12), also known as the Highway of Legends National Scenic Byway, in the U.S. state of Colorado is a mountainous state highway through the Rocky Mountains in southern Colorado.  The route travels from La Veta through the mountains to Trinidad.  It is included in the Colorado Scenic and Historic Byways system and runs through the San Isabel National Forest. In 2021, the highway was designated a National Scenic Byway.

Route description

SH 12 begins at the junction with U.S. Route 160 (US 160) north of La Veta. It heads southward through that town before entering the San Isabel National Forest and passing through Cuchara, near the Spanish Peaks Wilderness. It then crosses Cucharas Pass into Las Animas County.

SH 12 heads through Monument Park and turns eastward near Stonewall Gap. It then passes eastward along the Purgatoire River through Weston, Segundo, Valdez, Cokedale, and Jansen. It then ends in Trinidad at an intersection with Interstate 25, US 85, and US 87.

History
The route was established in the 1920s, beginning at Stonewall at SH 111 east to Trinidad and La Junta. The Trinidad-La Junta section was replaced by US 350 in 1957 and the route was paved from Weston to Trinidad in 1939. The entire route was paved by 1946. In 1954, SH 111 was changed, leaving SH 12's terminus without another state highway. In 1970, SH 12 was extended to US 160, and the segment was paved a year later. The route was designated a Colorado Scenic and Historic Byway in 1989.

Major intersections

References

External links

Ryan's Digital Roadgeekdom - The Southern Figure-8 Tour, Page 6
Ryan's Digital Roadgeekdom - The Southern Figure-8 Tour, Page 7

Transportation in Huerfano County, Colorado
Transportation in Las Animas County, Colorado
012